
Gmina Jodłowa is a rural gmina (administrative district) in Dębica County, Subcarpathian Voivodeship, in south-eastern Poland.

The gmina contains part of the protected area called Pasmo Brzanki Landscape Park.

Villages
Gmina Jodłowa contains the villages and settlements of Dęborzyn, Dębowa, Dzwonowa, Jodłowa and Zagórze.

Neighbouring gminas
Gmina Jodłowa is bordered by the gminas of Brzostek, Brzyska, Pilzno, Ryglice and Szerzyny.

References
Polish official population figures 2006

Jodlowa
Dębica County